Heath forest is a type of tropical moist forest found in areas with acidic, sandy soils that are extremely nutrient-poor. Notable examples are the Rio Negro campinarana of the Amazon Basin in South America, and the Sundaland heath forests (also known as Kerangas forests) of Borneo and neighboring islands.

External links

Tropical and subtropical moist broadleaf forests